R&J Stone were the English/American husband and wife musical duo, Russell Oliver Stone and Joanne Stone. The pair were originally members of James Last's British Choir for a number of years. They had a hit single in the mid 1970s with their self penned song "We Do It". The track was produced by Phil Swern. Some time after their hit, Russell Stone decided that he did not want to remain as a singer, and preferred to concentrate on producing and writing for his wife. Their second album did not do well and a third album, although recorded, was never released.

Joanne Stone died of a brain tumour in 1979.

Russell Stone later went to Munich to work with the Icelander Thorir Baldursson. Stone, a recovered alcoholic, has released three solo albumsLove Aspects (2013), Groove Aspects (2014) and Devotional Aspects (2016)after spending years out of the music industry.

Discography

Albums
We Do It - RCA RS 1052 - 1976 (AUS number 12)
R&J - RCA PL 25069 - 1977
Very Best of R&J Stone - Lynx Music UK LYX004CD - 2012

Singles
 "We Do It" / "We Love Each Other" - RCA 2616 - 1976 (UK number 5)(AUS number 3)
 "One Chance" / "I Just Can't Get It Right" - RCA 2660 - 1976
 "There's No Other Way" / "I Just Can't Get It Right" - RCA 2681 - 1976
 "Thrown It All Away" / "Home Is Where the Heart Is"  - RCA 2746 - 1976
 "It Just Goes to Show" - RCA PB 5018 - 1977

References

External links
 
 
 
 
 
 
 
 

English pop music duos
Married couples
Male–female musical duos
RCA Records artists